Brock William Motum (born 16 October 1990) is an Australian professional basketball player for Levanga Hokkaido of the Japanese B.League. He is also a member of the Australian national basketball team.

College career
Motum, a  power forward-centre from Brisbane, played basketball at the Australian Institute of Sport.  In 2009, he moved to the United States to play college basketball for the Washington State Cougars.  In his four-year career, Motum scored 1,530 points (12.8 per game) and left WSU fifth on the school's all-time scoring list.  As a junior in 2011–12, Motum averaged 18.0 points per game to lead the Pac-12 Conference.  He was named first team All-Pac-12 and the league's Most Improved Player.  In his senior year, he averaged 18.7 points per game and was named second team All-Pac-12.

Professional career

Granarolo Bologna (2013–2014) 
After going undrafted in the 2013 NBA draft, Motum joined the Philadelphia 76ers for the 2013 NBA Summer League. On 27 July 2013, he signed a two-year deal with Granarolo Bologna of the Lega Basket Serie A, with an NBA out-clause for 2014. In 25 games for Bologna in 2013–14, he averaged 8.3 points and 3.3 rebounds per game.

Adelaide 36ers (2014–2015) 
After averaging 8.0 points and 4.6 rebounds over five Summer League games for the Utah Jazz, Motum signed a non-guaranteed contract with the franchise on 26 August 2014. He was later waived by the Jazz on 25 October 2014 after appearing in one preseason game.

On 3 November 2014, Motum signed a conditional two-year deal with the Adelaide 36ers of the National Basketball League. Backing up 7'1" (216 cm) Luke Schenscher at centre in his debut game on 9 November, Motum recorded 28 points and 6 rebounds in the 36ers' 100-107 loss to the Sydney Kings. While the 36ers lost their first seven games with Motum, they began a fightback effort to try and qualify for the 2014–15 NBL playoffs as they won eight out of their next 10 games. During this time with Schenscher restricted by an ankle injury, Motum moved to the starting lineup at power forward and 6'11" (212 cm) Daniel Johnson (who rejoined the club late in the season after a stint in Poland) playing at centre, with the two forming a formidable front court combination. On 23 January 2015, he was named Player of the Week for Round 15 after recording 31 points and 13 rebounds on 16 January against Perth, and 17 points and 11 rebounds on 18 January against Wollongong.

On 5 February 2015, Motum was named the Player of the Month for January after leading the 36ers to a monthly record of 5-1 while averaging 20.8 points over the six games. In 24 games for Adelaide in 2014–15, he averaged 17.5 points and 7.1 rebounds per game.

In June 2015, Motum exercised the NBA and European out clause in his contract with the 36ers, parting ways with the club.

Žalgiris (2015–2017) 
In July 2015, Motum re-joined the Utah Jazz for the 2015 NBA Summer League. In eight Summer League games for the Jazz, he averaged 8.3 points and 3.9 rebounds per game.

On 4 August 2015, Motum signed a one-year deal, with the option of a second, with Žalgiris Kaunas of the Lithuanian Basketball League. On 7 August 2016, he re-signed with the team. Motum had an amazing second season, becoming one of the team leaders in the Euroleague, and in the LKL, turning the criticism of the first season to praise in the second one. During his time with Žalgiris, Motum won the LKL championships in 2016 and 2017, and the KMT Cup in 2017.

Anadolu Efes (2017–2019) 
On 29 June 2017, Motum signed a one-year deal with Turkish club Anadolu Efes.

Valencia (2019–2020) 
On 2 July 2019, Motum signed a two-year deal with Spanish club Valencia Basket. After averaging 5.9 points per game, he ended his contract on July 4, 2020.

Galatasaray (2020–2021) 
On 10 August 2020, Motum signed with Galatasaray of the Basketball Super League and the Basketball Champions League.

Nanterre 92 (2021)
On 5 May 2021, Motum signed with Nanterre 92 of the LNB Pro A until the end of the season on loan.

Monaco (2021–present) 
On 2 September 2021, Motum signed with AS Monaco of the LNB Pro A.

Career statistics

EuroLeague

|-
| style="text-align:left;"| 2015–16
| style="text-align:left;" rowspan=2| Zalgiris
| 24 || 3 || 17.2 || .485 || .351 || .750 || 2.8 || .5 || .5 || .0 || 6.7 || 5.1
|-
| style="text-align:left;"| 2016–17
| 30 || 0 || 23.1 || .539 || .462 || .709 || 3.4 || .5 || .6 || .1 || 10.8 || 9.5
|-
| style="text-align:left;"| 2017–18
| style="text-align:left;" rowspan=2| Anadolu Efes
| 29 || 14 || 19.2 || .475 || .384 || .967 || 3.0 || .7 || .3 || .0 || 8.7 || 7.6
|-
| style="text-align:left;"| 2018–19
| 31 || 1 || 11.6 || .506 || .440 || .781 || 1.8 || .4 || .1 || .1 || 6.5 || 5.6
|- class="sortbottom"
| align="center" colspan="2"| Career
| 114 || 18 || 20.2 || .504 || .416 || .787 || 2.7 || .5 || .4 || .0 || 8.2 || 7.3

International career
Motum first represented Australia in the 2009 FIBA Under-19 World Championship in Auckland, New Zealand, helping the team to a 7–2 record and a fourth-place finish.  Motum led the tournament in field goal percentage, shooting .600 from the floor.

On 28 July 2014, he was named to the 2014 Boomers' squad for the 2014 FIBA Basketball World Cup in Spain.

Personal
Motum is the son of Greg and Leonie Motum, and has a sister, Anna.

On 15 August 2017, he proposed to former Žalgiris TV presenter Martyna Marmaitė which he met while playing for Žalgiris Kaunas.

References

External links
 Washington State Cougars bio
 Brock Motum at australia.basketball
 Brock Motum at euroleague.net
 Brock Motum at legabasket.it
 

1990 births
Living people
2014 FIBA Basketball World Cup players
Adelaide 36ers players
Anadolu Efes S.K. players
AS Monaco Basket players
Australian expatriate basketball people in France
Australian expatriate basketball people in Italy
Australian expatriate basketball people in Lithuania
Australian expatriate basketball people in Spain
Australian expatriate basketball people in Turkey
Australian expatriate basketball people in the United States
Australian Institute of Sport basketball players
Australian men's basketball players
Basketball players at the 2016 Summer Olympics
Basketball players from Brisbane
BC Žalgiris players
Galatasaray S.K. (men's basketball) players
Liga ACB players
Nanterre 92 players
Olympic basketball players of Australia
People educated at Brisbane State High School
Power forwards (basketball)
Valencia Basket players
Virtus Bologna players
Washington State Cougars men's basketball players